Sara Allen (born March 23, 1954) is an American songwriter best known for her work with the duo Hall & Oates. She was in a long-term relationship with Daryl Hall, which ended in 2001, and contributed to many of the duo's hit singles, including "You Make My Dreams", "Private Eyes", "I Can't Go for That (No Can Do)" and "Maneater".

The song "Sara Smile", Hall & Oates' first American hit, is about Allen.

Her sister Janna Allen was also a songwriter who worked with Hall & Oates.

References

External links 
 

American women songwriters
Living people
Place of birth missing (living people)
Hall & Oates members
1954 births
21st-century American women